The 2020–21 Louisiana–Monroe Warhawks men's basketball team represented the University of Louisiana at Monroe in the 2020–21 NCAA Division I men's basketball season. The Warhawks, led by 11th-year head coach Keith Richard, played their home games at Fant–Ewing Coliseum in Monroe, Louisiana as members of the Sun Belt Conference. With the creation of divisions to cut down on travel due to the COVID-19 pandemic, they played in the West Division.

Previous season
The Warhawks finished the 2019–20 season 9–20, 5–15 in Sun Belt play to finish in a tie for 11th place. They failed to qualify for the Sun Belt tournament.

Roster

Schedule and results

|-
!colspan=12 style=| Non-conference Regular season

|-
!colspan=12 style=| Conference Regular season

|-
!colspan=12 style=| Sun Belt tournament
|-

Source

References

Louisiana–Monroe Warhawks men's basketball seasons
Louisiana-Monroe Warhawks
Louisiana-Monroe Warhawks men's basketball
Louisiana-Monroe Warhawks men's basketball